Vásáry is a Hungarian surname. Notable people with the surname include:

André Vásáry (born 1982), Hungarian singer and sopranist
István Vásáry (1887–1955), Hungarian politician
Tamás Vásáry (born 1933), Hungarian classical pianist and composer

Hungarian-language surnames